Cedar Springs is an unincorporated community in Cedar County, in the U.S. state of Missouri.

History
A variant name was Balm. The first permanent settlement at Balm was made in 1844. A post office called Balm was established in 1885, the name was changed to Cedar Springs in 1910, and the post office closed in 1937.

References

Unincorporated communities in Cedar County, Missouri
Unincorporated communities in Missouri